Martin Frýdek (born 24 March 1992) is a Czech football defender who currently plays for FC Luzern. He is the son of former national team player and namesake Martin Frýdek. His brother, Christián Frýdek, is also a footballer.

Club career
Frýdek scored the opening goal in Sparta's 1–1 Europa League round of 16 first leg match against Lazio Rome, describing it as "the most beautiful goal I've ever scored".

International career
Frýdek got his first call up to the senior Czech Republic side for a UEFA Euro 2016 qualifier against the Netherlands in October 2015.

Honours
 Slovan Liberec
Czech Cup: 2014–15

References

External links

Sparta Prague profile

1992 births
Living people
Czech footballers
Czech Republic youth international footballers
Czech Republic under-21 international footballers
Czech Republic international footballers
Association football defenders
AC Sparta Prague players
FK Senica players
FC Slovan Liberec players
Czech First League players
Slovak Super Liga players
Expatriate footballers in Slovakia
Sportspeople from Hradec Králové
Czech expatriate sportspeople in Slovakia
FC Luzern players
Expatriate footballers in Switzerland
Czech expatriate sportspeople in Switzerland